Anania fusalis is a moth in the family Crambidae. It was described by George Hampson in 1912. It is found in Cameroon, Equatorial Guinea, Kenya, Nigeria, Sierra Leone, South Africa, Tanzania and Uganda.

References

Moths described in 1912
Pyraustinae
Moths of Africa